Eucyclotoma tricarinata is a species of sea snail, a marine gastropod mollusk in the family Raphitomidae.

Description
The length of the shell attains 16 mm, its diameter 7 mm.

The shell is large for the genus. It is lanceolate and rather solid. The colour is crystalline white, splashed irregularly with orange buff. The protoconch is buff. Besides a two-whorled mucronate protoconch there are about seven whorls which wind obliquely and are girt with solid projecting keels. The turreted spire is
a little longer than the body whorl. 

Sculpture: On the body whorl are four nearly equal girdles. The second and fourth diminish as they ascend, and vanish in a thread two whorls above. The keel forming the basal angle just emerges above the suture on the upper whorls. Close set 
perpendicular riblets bead the keels at the point of intersection, and their interstices are again traversed by smaller spiral threads. On the snout are half-a-dozen spirals. One specimen has a perfect varix half a whorl behind the aperture.  The nucleus has close spiral threads reticulated by finer radials. 

Aperture : the outer lip is flared, its edge dentate by the girdle ends, and roughened by intermediate wrinkles. The sinus is subsutural, ovate and contracted at the entrance. The siphonal canal is short and bent. The columella is excavate above and twisted below. The inner lip is represented by a thin film of callus.

Distribution
This marine species occurs off Taiwan, Japan, the Philippines, Fiji, Queensland, Australia.

References

 Powell, A.W.B. 1966. The molluscan families Speightiidae and Turridae, an evaluation of the valid taxa, both Recent and fossil, with list of characteristic species. Bulletin of the Auckland Institute and Museum. Auckland, New Zealand 5: 1–184, pls 1–23 
 Liu J.Y. [Ruiyu] (ed.)(2008). Checklist of marine biota of China seas. China Science Press. 1267 pp

External links
 
 Li B.-Q. [Baoquan & Li X.-Z. [Xinzheng] (2014) Report on the Raphitomidae Bellardi, 1875 (Mollusca: Gastropoda: Conoidea) from the China Seas. Journal of Natural History 48(17-18): 999-1025]

tricarinata
Gastropods described in 1840